The Negros Occidental National Science High School or NONSHS is a public science high school at Estrella Road, Brgy. XIV, Victorias City, Negros Occidental, Philippines. It is a Department of Education-recognized National Science high school.

Its old name, Negros Occidental Science High School, was changed after fulfilling the qualifications and standards of a national-level secondary school. It was announced in June 2010, official resuming of classes. Major changes were applied to the school.

History

The Negros Occidental National Science High School (NONSHS), formerly known as Negros Occidental Science High School (NOSHS), started its active curriculum in 1997. Primary school graduates take the entrance exam in order to be admitted to the school's curriculum.

References

Science high schools in the Philippines
High schools in Negros Occidental
Public schools in the Philippines